Klaas van der Horst (Amsterdam, 15 September 1731 - Haarlem, 1 May 1825) was a Dutch Mennonite teacher and minister.

Klaas was trained at the Mennonite seminary in Amsterdam, and served in Goes 1752-1757, Zwolle 1757, and Leiden 1757-1761 before moving to the Doopsgezinde kerk, Haarlem where he served 1761-1825. During his service the congregations of the Haarlem Mennonite community were united (the largest were Vlaamse Blok and Waterlanders) in 1784 and the sermon he gave on this occasion based on John 15:14 was published by his friend Adriaan Loosjes.

He had been friends with Pieter Teyler van der Hulst and was named in his will as member of the Teylers First Society, a position which he filled from 1778-1825. He lived to a great age.

References

author page in the DBNL

1731 births
1825 deaths
Dutch Mennonites
Clergy from Amsterdam
Members of Teylers Eerste Genootschap
Mennonite ministers
Mennonite writers
18th-century Anabaptist ministers
Clergy from Haarlem